Josefin Taljegård (born 26 August 1995) is a Swedish figure skater. She is the 2018 Nordics bronze medalist, a two-time Swedish national bronze medalist (2018, 2019), the 2020 Swedish national silver medalist, and the 2022 Swedish national champion. 

She competed at the 2022 European Championships, the 2021 and 2022 World Championships, and the 2022 Olympic Games.

Taljegård is coached by her sisters, Maria and Malin.

Programs

Competitive highlights 
CS: Challenger Series; JGP: Junior Grand Prix

References

External links 

1995 births
Swedish female single skaters
Living people
Sportspeople from Gothenburg
Figure skaters at the 2022 Winter Olympics
Olympic figure skaters of Sweden
21st-century Swedish women